Zone 95 is a zone of the municipality of Al Wakrah in the state of Qatar. The main district recorded in the 2015 population census was Al Kharrara. 

Other districts which fall within its administrative boundaries are Traina and Wadi Jallal.

Demographics
As of the 2010 census, the zone comprised 45 housing units. There were 117 people living in the zone, of which 100% were male and 0% were female. Out of the 117 inhabitants, 98% were 20 years of age or older and 2% were under the age of 20. The literacy rate stood at 70.1%. Employed persons made up 100% of the total population.

Land use
The Ministry of Municipality and Environment (MME) breaks down land use in the zone as follows.

References 

Zones of Qatar
Al Wakrah